The Achievement Medal is a military decoration of the United States Armed Forces. The Achievement Medal was first proposed as a means to recognize outstanding achievement or meritorious service of military personnel who were not eligible to receive the higher Commendation Medal or the Meritorious Service Medal.

Each military service issues its own version of the Achievement Medal, with a fifth version authorized by the U.S. Department of Defense for joint military activity. The Achievement Medal is awarded for outstanding achievement or meritorious service not of a nature that would otherwise warrant awarding the Commendation Medal. Award authority rests with local commanders, granting a broad discretion of when and for what action the Achievement Medal may be awarded.

History

Navy and Marine Corps
The Navy and Marine Corps Achievement Medal (NAM), is the United States Navy and U.S. Marine Corps' version of the Achievement Medal. The U.S. Navy was the first branch of the U.S. Armed Forces to award such a medal, doing so in 1961, when it was dubbed the "Secretary of the Navy Commendation for Achievement Medal." This title was shortened in 1967 to simply, the "Navy Achievement Medal." On August 19, 1994, to recognize those of the United States Marine Corps who had received the Navy Achievement Medal, the name of the decoration was officially changed to the "Navy and Marine Corps Achievement Medal". The award is still often referred to in shorthand speech as the "Navy Achievement Medal" or "NAM" for short.

Chain of Command approval
From its inception in the early 1960s to 2002, the Navy and Marine Corps Achievement Medal could not be approved by the commanding officers of ships, submarines, aviation squadron, or shore activities who held the rank of Commander (O-5). Awards for crewmembers had to be submitted to the Commodore or Air Wing Commander or the first appropriate O-6 in the chain of command for approval, who then signed the award and returned it. This led to a dramatically lower awarding rate when compared to similar size units in the Army or Air Force awarding their own achievement medals, especially considering that those services did not establish their respective achievement medals until the 1980s. Since 2002 the commanding officers of aviation squadrons and ships have had the authority to award NAMs without submission to higher authority.  This is in contrast to the Army, where battalion commanders or the first O-5 in a soldier's chain of command are the authorizing official.

Army, Air Force, Space Force, and Coast Guard
The United States Coast Guard created its own Coast Guard Achievement Medal in 1967; the U.S. Army and U.S. Air Force and U.S. Space Force issued their own versions of the award with the Army Achievement Medal (AAM) in 1981  and Air Force Achievement Medal (AFAM) in 1980. Effective 11 September 2001, the Army Achievement Medal may be awarded in a combat area. Since this change over sixty thousand Army Achievement Medals have been awarded in theaters of operations such as Iraq and Afghanistan. On 16 November 2020, the Air Force Achievement Medal was renamed to the Air and Space Achievement Medal (ASAM) by the Secretary of the Air Force.

Joint Service Achievement Medal
The Joint Service Achievement Medal (JSAM) was created in 1983. This award was considered a Department of Defense decoration senior to the service department Achievement Medals.

Ribbon devices
The following devices may be authorized to be worn on the following achievement medals suspension ribbon and service ribbon:
 All Achievement Medals "C" device, which signifies meritorious performance "under combat conditions" after January 2016
 Joint Service Achievement Medal (all service branches) for additional awards, oak leaf clusters
 Army Achievement Medal for additional awards, oak leaf clusters
 Navy and Marine Corps Achievement Medal for additional awards, 5/16 inch stars
 Air and Space Achievement Medal for additional awards, oak leaf clusters
 Coast Guard Achievement Medal for additional awards, 5/16 inch stars 
 Coast Guard Achievement Medal Operational Distinguishing Device ("O" device)
 Coast Guard Achievement Medal Combat Distinguishing Device (Combat "V")

Former ribbon devices
The following ribbon devices were authorized in the past but have now been discontinued:

 Air Force Achievement Medal "V" Device until December 2016
 Navy and Marine Corps Achievement Medal Combat Distinguishing Device (Combat "V") until December 2016

See also
 Awards and decorations of the United States government
 Awards and decorations of the United States military
 Awards and decorations of the United States Coast Guard

References

External links

 Navy and Marine Corps Achievement Medal Citation Examples
 HRC Joint Awards FAQ

Awards and decorations of the United States Air Force
Awards and decorations of the United States Army
Awards and decorations of the United States Coast Guard
Awards and decorations of the United States Marine Corps
Awards and decorations of the United States Navy
Awards and decorations of the United States Space Force
Awards established in 1961 
Awards established in 1967 
Awards established in 1981 
Awards established in 1983 
Awards established in 1994 
1961 establishments in the United States
1967 establishments in the United States
1981 establishments in the United States
1983 establishments in the United States
1994 establishments in the United States